A tortilla machine, called in Spanish máquina tortilladora, is a machine for processing corn dough (masa) into corn tortillas for serial production. They are usually found in tortillerías or tortilla shops in Mexico and some parts of the United States and produce from 30 to 60 tortillas per minute.

These Mexican-patented machines receive a mass of nixtamalized corn for compression and shaping into thin tortillas. These are passed through an oven on a metal conveyor belt for baking, followed by packaging for sale to consumers. Tortillas are sold by weight rather than number.

History of patents
1904 - Everardo Ramírez / Luis Romero
1905 - Ramón Benítez
1910 Luis Romero
1915 - La India S.A. company
1920 - C. Celorio / A. S. Olague 
1921 - Luis Romero
1947 ; 1959 - Fausto Celorio
1963 ; 1975 - Fausto Celorio

References
Prodiamexretrieved dec.2017

Machines